The Wills One-Day Trophy (named after sponsor Wills of ITC Limited), commonly referred to as the Wills Trophy, was an Indian List A cricket tournament organized by the Board of Control for Cricket in India (BCCI). Established in the 1977–78 season, it was played to find the best limited overs side of the domestic season as only the Ranji Trophy had inter-zonal finals. The annual tournament was played between seven sides, the five zonal winners and two composite teams, Wills XI (named after the title sponsor) and Indian Board President XI. Till the 1992–93 season, the team finishing first in each Zone of the Ranji Trophy qualified to play this tournament. Since the 1993–94 season, the team finishing first in each Zone of the Ranji One-Day Trophy qualified to play this tournament.

Tournament History

Teams Summary

See also
 Cricket in India
 NKP Salve Challenger Trophy
 Deodhar Trophy
 Vijay Hazare Trophy

References

Indian domestic cricket competitions
List A cricket competitions
ITC Limited